Jean-Charles Capelli (born 28 July 1983) is a French businessman. He is a board member of the international Groupe CAPELLI; associate Chez Pimousse gastronomic restaurant in Lyon; chairman and co-founder of Metaverse Gaming League; CEO and co-founder of The Crypto Show; and chairman of Dubit.

Career 
Capelli has been board member of CAPELLI since 19 September 2006.

In 2022, Capelli launched Croix-Noire, an art project with Mike Batt, linking music, comics and video games.

Awards 

 Chevalier de l'Ordre national du Mérite (2 May 2017)
Rank 57 in the Choiseul 100 ranking (2020)

References 

1983 births
Living people
21st-century French businesspeople
French chairpersons of corporations
French chief executives
French investors
People from Lyon